Qixian Temple, also known as Guanyin Cave, is a Buddhist temple located on Mount Wutai of Taihuai Town, in Wutai County, Shanxi, China.

History
The temple was originally built in the Kangxi era (1662–1722) of the Qing dynasty (1644–1911).

Legend said that the 6th Dalai Lama once settled at the temple.

The temple has been added to the list of National Key Buddhist Temples in Han Chinese Area by the State Council of China.

Architecture
The existing main buildings include the Shanmen, Mahavira Hall, Hall of Guanyin and Meditation Hall.

References

Buddhist temples on Mount Wutai
Tibetan Buddhist temples in Shanxi
Gelug monasteries and temples
Buildings and structures in Xinzhou
Tourist attractions in Xinzhou
18th-century establishments in China
18th-century Buddhist temples
Wutai County